Gheorghe "The Carpathian Bear" Ignat (born December 11, 1983, in Suceava, Romania) is a mixed martial artist with a background in Greco-Roman Wrestling.

Wrestling career
Gheorghe Ignat is the 8-time Greco-Roman Heavyweight Wrestling champion of Romania. He is also the current Balkan champion, as well as winner of multiple Silver and Bronze Medals in numerous International Wrestling championships. He won more than 40 medals in total.

In 1995, Ignat began wrestling after he was discovered by Valerica Gherasim. Gherasim paid special attention to Ignat due to his size at the time; 6' tall and 220 lbs by the age of 12. After three years of training, Ignat won a national championship in 1998 and was invited by the Romanian Wrestling Federation (F.R.L.) to the Junior National Team at the age of 15.

In 1999, he made the Senior Olympic team at the age of 16, the youngest wrestler in Romanian history to do so. He trained with the team for years in Poiana Braşov, a city at the base of the Carpathian Mountains.

Gheorghe Ignat later transitioned from the sport called Greco-Roman Wrestling to the sport called Mixed Martial Arts.

Sambo career
Gheorghe Ignat is a 2-time Sambo (Russian martial arts) champion of Romania.  Gheorghe started his Sambo career in 2014, winning the Romanian Nationals in the same year, receiving double gold medals in Sambo Combat and Sambo Sportiv. In May 2014, Ignat won the bronze medal at the European Sambo Championship.

Mixed Martial Arts career
In October 2009, Ignat moved to the United States to become a MMA fighter. He joined "The Arena" gym in San Diego. Ignat also instructs Greco-Roman Wrestling to other professional fighters located at The Arena.
In 2010, Ignat fought for the first time in the cage at the MMA Promotion Gladiator Challenge that took place in San Jacinto, California, where defeated Ryan Varela. After 5 years Ignat it is still undefeated in the heavyweight division. He has a clean record of 6 wins with 0 loses.

Personal life
Gheorghe Ignat is married to his childhood sweetheart, Adriana, and together they have 4 children. In 2013, Gheorghe and Adriana became practicing evangelical Christians, an event that had a profound, life-changing impact on the couple. Gheorghe gave up practicing contact sports and focused on deepening his Christian life, and  he and Adriana started different social projects to help, vulnerable people. Though they had made the decision to devote their lives to doing good, this new life wasn't to come to be without first paying for past mistakes.  In 2015, Gheorghe Ignat was sentenced to 4 years in prison for acts committed many years prior, when he was young. During his time in prison, Gheorghe continued to devote himself to his new Christian faith, even leading Bible studies and prayer meetings in prison and receiving commendations from prison authorities for the positive impact this work was having on the prison inmates.  In August 2018, Gheorghe was released from prison with a new vision and passion for serving marginalized, "throw away" members of society, including ex-convicts, the homeless, and the highly impoverished, including the Roma community.  Gheorghe he returned to Suceava where he was awaited by his loving wife and family.  He became co-owner of a business, Urspack, that produced paper packaging products but, more importantly, had a mission to provide good quality jobs to ex-prisoners who sought to start a new life after paying their debt to society.  Soon, Urspack's efforts for ex-prisoners extended beyond a job and included provided temporary housing, emotional/social support, and even food for these men until they could gain indenpendence.  Over time, Urspack began hiring other "difficult-to-hire" individuals, including disabled people and refugees from other countries.  These experiences led Gheorghe to his great passion, humanitarian work.

Humanitarian Work
In 2019, Gheorge became Co-Founder and President of Fight For Freedom, a nonprofit organization based in his home town of Suceava that serves the north-east region of Romania with social services aimed at alleviating suffering and bringing transformative change to underserved and marginalized communities.  Fight For Freedom's work began with food distribution into highly impoverished local communities, a harbinger of future work to come.  Later that year, Fight For Freedom acquired and began renovating a 1,600 square meter building to create a 44-dormitory residential facility.  Naming it Freedom House, the facility would house ex-convicts seeking a new life in a 1-year rehabilitation and society reintegration program, including job training, life skills training, spiritual support, and therapeutic services.

In 2021, Fight For Freedom launched its next significant program:  Home For The Homeless.  Through the 30-bed facility, Fight For Freedom provides shelter, food, clothing, and care services that improve the security, health, and dignity of individuals and families experiencing homelessness.  To date, Home For The Homeless has served hundreds of homeless people in Suceave, Romania.  In so doing, Fight For Freedom demonstrates their core belief that every life is precious and worthy of love and the opportunity for redemption.

Early in 2022, at the start of the Russia-Ukraine war, Fight For Freedom anticipated and responded to the humanitarian crisis that would ensue, and from the first day of the war began delivering food to Ukrainian refugees flooding the Ukraine-Romania border.  Under Gheorghe's leadership, that work grew to comprise the organizing and delivery of large food convoys into Ukraine, reaching cities throughout the country where food shortages have become a severe reality.  To date, Fight For Freedom has delivered an estimated 2500 tons of food and medical supplies into war-torn Ukraine.  In addition, Fight For Freedom mobilized resources to provide critical shelter, food, and care to refugees fleeing Ukraine into Romania.  Housing refugees at their Freedom House, and their Home For The Homeless, Fight For Freedom has sheltered, fed, and cared for over 3000 Ukrainian refugees.  And through relief tents erected at the Siret border between Ukraine and Romania, Fight For Freedom has brought direct assistance to an estimated 80.000 Ukrainian refugees in the forms of food, temporary shelter, assistance with connecting with friends and family, and relocation to the West.

Later in the war, Fight for Freedom's work on behalf of Ukraine expanded again in an unexpected way.   In order to keep orphaned children safe from Russian soldiers who have engaged a systematic campaign of raiding orphanages in eastern Ukraine, abducting the children and removing them to undisclosed locations in Russia, the Ukrainian government launched a campaign to evacuate orphans from Ukraine to neighboring countries where they could be safe.  Hearing of Fight For Freedom's extraordinary work on behalf of the Ukrainian people, Ukrainian government authorities contacted Gheorghe with the urgent request that Fight For Freedom take in Ukrainian orphans.  Fight For Freedom immediately mobilized, retrofitting Freedom House and renting additional facility space to house, feed, and care for nearly 200 orphans from Odessa and Kyiv, plus Ukrainian orphanage workers and their children.

Books and Publications
Gheorge Ignat wrote his first book, "They Called Me Crazy," which was published in the United States by Trilogy Publishing in March 2022. This book is a testimony of some very deep and personal experiences of the author during his time in prison -  experiences that marked him irrevocably and totally changed his perspective on life. Gheorghe in the near future, is currently working on his next book, which is intended to be his autobiography. Gheorghe also writes on his personal blog georgeignat.com, where he has published more than 200 articles on various social and spiritual topics, many of which have been picked up by the Romanian press.

Mixed martial arts record

| Win
|align=center| 6-0
|  Istvan Ruzsinszki
| TKO
| Romanian Xtreme Fighting 13
| 
|align=center| 1
|align=center| 0 30
| Botoșani, Romania
|
|-
| Win
|align=center| 5-0
|  Vladimir Siminotov
| Submission (Americana)
| FFG 4 - Full Fight Gala 4
| 
|align=center| 1
|align=center| 0 58
| Satu Mare, Romania
|
|-
| Win
|align=center| 4-0
|  Atilla Ucar
| TKO
| EFC European Fighting Championship
| 
|align=center| 2
|align=center| 5 00
| Iași, Romania
|
|-
| Win
|align=center| 3-0
|  Marius Grosu
| Submission (armbar)
| FFG - Full Fight Satu Mare
| 
|align=center| 1
|align=center| 3:30
| Satu Mare, Romania
|
|-
| Win
|align=center| 2-0
|  Marius Bivol
| Submission (kimura)
| HPF - Hungary vs. Eastern Europe
| 
|align=center| 1
|align=center| 1:35
| Debrecen, Hungary
| 
|-
| Win
|align=center| 1-0
|  Ryan Varela
| Decision (unanimous)
| Gladiator Challenge - Maximum Force
| 
|align=center| 3
|align=center| 5:00
| San Jacinto, California, United States
|

References

   1.https://www.monitorulsv.ro/Local/2011-01-24/Gheorghe-Ignat-Ursul-Carpatin-suceveanul-care-se-lupta-in-custile-MMA (in Romanian)

   2.https://notizieguerra.it/news/guerra-russia-ucraina-gli-ex-detenuti-rumeni-ora-accolgono-i-profughi-al-confine-il-progetto-dell-associazione-fight-for-freedom/23645

   3.https://glasulsucevei.ro/intamplarea-patita-de-ghita-ignat-intr-un-magazin-din-cernauti-poate-totusi-ucrainenii-nu-sunt-atat-de-rai-cum-scriu-unii-pe-facebook-poate-ca-toate-eforturile-noastre-merita-a-fi-facute/

   4.https://observatornews.ro/eveniment/celebrul-luptator-ursul-carpatin-isi-risca-viata-pentru-a-duce-ajutoare-in-ucraina-moment-emotionant-in-cernauti-dupa-ce-patronul-unui-magazin-la-recunoscut-463267.html

External links

1983 births
Living people
Romanian male mixed martial artists
Super heavyweight mixed martial artists
Mixed martial artists utilizing Greco-Roman wrestling
Mixed martial artists utilizing sambo
Romanian male sport wrestlers
Romanian sambo practitioners
Sportspeople from Suceava